Alcester was a railway station serving  Alcester in the English county of Warwickshire.

History

Opened by the Evesham and Redditch Railway, and joining the Midland Railway, it became part of the London, Midland and Scottish Railway during the Grouping of 1923. The line then passed on to the London Midland Region of British Railways on nationalisation in 1948. It was then closed by the British Transport Commission.

For a while the station was the junction of a Great Western Railway line to Bearley.

The site today
The station house is lived in and has been extended. The goods shed has now been demolished. The former railway alignment is now occupied by a housing estate.

References

Further reading

External links 
 Station on navigable O.S. map
 Picture
 Location 

Former Midland Railway stations
Railway stations in Great Britain opened in 1866
Railway stations in Great Britain closed in 1962
Disused railway stations in Warwickshire
1866 establishments in England
Alcester